"Walk This Way" is a song by Aerosmith.

Walk This Way may also refer to:

Music
 Walk This Way (album), a 2008 album by The White Tie Affair
 "Walk This Way" (MØ song), 2014 
 "Walk This Way" (Daniel Ash song), 1991

Other uses
 "Walk this way" (humor), a recurrent pun in some movies and television shows
 Walk This Way: The Autobiography of Aerosmith, a 1997 book by Stephen Davis
 "Walk This Way" is the 16th episode of the animated series W.I.T.C.H.